Sandro Raniere Guimarães Cordeiro (born 15 March 1989), or simply Sandro, is a Brazilian footballer, who plays as a midfielder.

Club career

Early career
Sandro is a product of Internacional's youth academy. He signed his first professional contract and began his senior career in 2007 as an 18-year-old.

Sandro was one of the main players of Inter's winning 2010 Copa Libertadores campaign. Sandro was already signed to Tottenham through most of the competition, but that did not affect his performance negatively: on the contrary, he said he "live[d] with great intensity, as each game could be the last".  With this in mind, he worked hard to stay at Internacional as long as possible in order to help the team reach the finals. After winning South America's top trophy, he flew to England the following week.

Tottenham Hotspur
In August 2009 Tottenham Hotspur were reported to have had a £14 million bid rejected for the player. However, on 20 October 2009, Spurs and Internacional agreed an affiliation of the two clubs, ensuring that Tottenham have first option on all academy players from the Brazilian outfit. Six days later Tottenham manager Harry Redknapp confirmed he was interested in Sandro for a fee rumoured to be around £8 million.

On 10 March 2010, Internacional President Vitorio Piffero confirmed the transfer of the midfielder to Tottenham, after the Copa Libertadores. The transfer amount was speculated to be around €10 million, with only the contract yet to be signed.

Both Internacional and Tottenham reported on their respective websites that a deal had been agreed for Sandro for an undisclosed fee. Sandro joined Tottenham following the end of the Copa Libertadores, which finished on 18 August. Internacional's financial report stated that the fee was R$ 20,633,850, with about 25% re-distributed by Inter to third party owners.

Tottenham Hotspur confirmed that a deal for Sandro had been completed and that he would join up at the end of Internacional's Copa Libertadores campaign. Sandro said of the move to England that he thought Spurs were "a great fit for me" and that "a club that is growing every year makes it the ideal club for me". He made his Tottenham debut in a 4–1 home defeat against Arsenal in the third round of the League Cup on 21 September 2010.

On 9 January 2011, Sandro made a start against League One side Charlton Athletic, assisting Andros Townsend and playing the full match. He made his UEFA Champions League debut for Tottenham on 15 February 2011 at the San Siro against seven times winners A.C. Milan, receiving special praise from manager Harry Redknapp in his side's 1–0 win. Playing a pivotal role just in front of the back four, he was man of the match in the return leg at White Hart Lane. He scored his first goal for the club against Chelsea with a 35-yard volley in a 2–1 defeat.

Sandro signed a new five-year contract with Tottenham on 8 September 2011, a deal which would have run till 2016.

In January 2013, Sandro picked up a knee injury during the game against Queens Park Rangers. After the game it was announced that Sandro would be out for the remainder of the 2012–13 season. Prior to the game, after a run of impressive performances Sandro has been affectionately nicknamed 'Beast' by the Tottenham fans.

He scored his third goal in Tottenham colours in December 2013 against Manchester United, with a powerful shot from  into the top corner described by opponent Wayne Rooney as "a great strike".

Queens Park Rangers
On 1 September 2014, Sandro signed for Queens Park Rangers for an undisclosed fee. He made his debut against Manchester United, coming off injured and replaced by Karl Henry. He scored his first goal for QPR against former club Tottenham on 7 March 2015.

On 29 January 2016, Sandro signed for West Brom on loan. He made his debut in the 1–1 draw with Swansea City.

Antalyaspor
On 11 January 2017, Sandro signed for Turkish club Antalyaspor on a three-year deal.
On 10 January 2018, Sandro signed with a loan contract with Benevento until 30 June 2018. He made his debut on 28 January 2018 in 3–0 away loss against Torino. He scored his first goal for Benevento during his 4th match by scoring the 1-1 goal in a 3–2 home win against Crotone.

Genoa
On 3 July 2018, Sandro signed a contract with Italian club Genoa. His contract with Genoa has been terminated in early 2020 after he didn't appear in any games for the club in the 2019–20 season.

Udinese
On 31 January 2019, Sandro joined Udinese on loan for the remainder of the 2018–19 season.

Goiás
On 18 January 2020, he joined Goiás.

International career

Having represented Brazil at Under-20 level, and captaining them at the 2009 South American Youth Championship, Sandro made his full debut for the Brazilian national team as a substitute in a World Cup qualifier against Chile on 9 September 2009. He was named as 1 of 7 back-up players to the 2010 FIFA World Cup squad.

Personal life
During his time in England, Sandro became interested in darts, and recorded a video with professional player Bobby George.

Career statistics

Club

International

References

External links
 Sandro at tottenhamhotspur.com
 
 
 Internacional.com.br 
 
 

1989 births
Living people
Brazilian footballers
Sport Club Internacional players
Tottenham Hotspur F.C. players
Queens Park Rangers F.C. players
West Bromwich Albion F.C. players
Antalyaspor footballers
Benevento Calcio players
Genoa C.F.C. players
Udinese Calcio players
Goiás Esporte Clube players
Belenenses SAD players
Brazil international footballers
Campeonato Brasileiro Série A players
Premier League players
English Football League players
Süper Lig players
Serie A players
Brazilian expatriate footballers
Expatriate footballers in England
Expatriate footballers in Turkey
Expatriate footballers in Italy
Expatriate footballers in Portugal
Association football midfielders
2011 Copa América players
Footballers at the 2012 Summer Olympics
Olympic footballers of Brazil
Olympic silver medalists for Brazil
Olympic medalists in football
Brazil youth international footballers
Medalists at the 2012 Summer Olympics
Sportspeople from Minas Gerais